Bart Williams may refer to:

 Bart Williams (actor) (1949–2015), American actor and filmmaker
 Bart Williams (rugby league), Australian rugby league player
 Bart Williams (politician), American politician in the Mississippi State Senate

Surname 
 Chris Bart-Williams (born 1974), British footballer
 Patrice Bart-Williams (born 1979), Sierra Leonean-German musician and film-maker
 Gaston Bart-Williams (1938-1990), Sierra Leonean writer and film director

See also 
 Bart, a given name
 Williams (disambiguation)